University of Loralai is in Loralai, Pakistan. The university started its academic activities in 2009.

History
The university was established in 2009 as a sub-campus of the University of Balochistan (UOB) Quetta. For this purpose, 500 acres of land at Zarr Karerz was provided by the Provincial Government which allocated 12 km from Loralai City at Quetta Road. The tentative proposal of the university was approved in the ECNEC meeting held in May 2011, allocation of Rs. 1518.751 million allocated by the HEC as per PC-1.

It was initially run under UoB administration for almost four years.

Later on, it was declared a full-fledged university with the promulgation of the University of Loralai Act No.VI of 2012, passed by the Baluchistan Provincial Assembly on 24 September 2012 and assented to by Governor, Baluchistan on 27 September 2012.

Prof. Dr. Abdullah Khan Kakar was appointed as first Vice Chancellor of the university, on 19 December 2014 and Noor-ul-Amin kakar was appointed 1st Registrar on 25 December 2014.

The new logo for the University of Loralrai was designed by Engr. Abdullah Naseer & Amir Zaman with the approval of Honorable Vice Chancellor  Prof. Engr. Dr. Maqsood Ahmad. The logo was approved on 10-October-2018 in presence of review committee.

Programs and departments

 BS(CS) Computer Science Dept. 4 years (8 semesters)
 MCS Computer Science Dept. 2 years (4 semesters)
 BBA Management Science Dept. 4 years (8 semesters)
 BBS Management Science Dept. 2 years (4 semesters)
 B.Com. Commerce Dept. 2 years (4 semesters)
 M.Com. Commerce Dept. 2 years (4 semesters)
 B.Ed. Education Dept. 4 years (8 semesters)
 B.Ed. Education Dept. 2.5 years (5 semesters)
 B.Ed. Education Dept. 2 years (4 semesters)
 B.Ed. Education Dept. 1.5 years (3 semesters)
 M.Ed. Education Dept. 1 year (annual system)
 BS Mathematics Dept.  4 year
 BS English department. 4 year
 B.Ed English department 2.5 year
 BS pashtoo department 4 years 
 B.Ed pashtoo department 2.5 year

See also
University of Loralai

References 

Educational institutions established in 2009
2009 establishments in Pakistan
Loralai District
Public universities and colleges in Balochistan, Pakistan